The Switzerland national under-23 football team (also known as Switzerland Olympic, Switzerland U-23) represents Switzerland in international football competitions in the Olympic Games. The selection is limited to players under the age of 23 however the Olympics allows for the addition of up to three overage players. The team is controlled by the Swiss Football Association (ASF/SFV). In three previous appearances, Switzerland has won one silver medal at the 1924 Olympics in Paris.

Competitive record

Olympic Games

*Denotes draws including knockout matches decided on penalty kicks.
<div style="text-align:left">

UEFA European Under-23 Championship

Results and fixtures

2012 Summer Olympics

Group stage

See also
 Switzerland national football team
 Switzerland national under-21 football team
 Switzerland national under-20 football team
 Switzerland national under-19 football team
 Switzerland national under-18 football team
 Switzerland national under-17 football team
 Switzerland national under-16 football team

References

External links
 Official website

European national under-23 association football teams
F